Thomas Boleyn may refer to:
Thomas Boleyn (priest) (died 1472), Master of Gonville Hall, great grand uncle of Queen Anne Boleyn
Thomas Boleyn, 1st Earl of Wiltshire (1477–1539), father of Anne Boleyn
Thomas Boleyn (The Tudors), character on the television series The Tudors